Căteasca is a commune in Argeș County, Muntenia, Romania. It is composed of seven villages: Catanele, Căteasca, Cireșu, Coșeri, Gruiu, Recea and Siliștea.

References

Communes in Argeș County
Localities in Muntenia